Pasteosia is a genus of moths in the subfamily Arctiinae.

Species
 Pasteosia irrorata Hampson, 1900
 Pasteosia orientalis Hampson, 1909
 Pasteosia plumbea Hampson, 1900

References

Natural History Museum Lepidoptera generic names catalog

Lithosiini
Moth genera